Leif Efskind (10 May 1904 – 26 February 1987) was a Norwegian surgeon. He was the first to perform regular heart surgery in Norway.

He was born at Verdal in Nord-Trøndelag, Norway. He graduated from the University of Oslo. He was associated with the Rikshospitalet and was a professor of surgery at the University of Oslo. He was the father of Lasse Efskind.

References

External links

1904 births
1987 deaths
People from Verdal
University of Oslo alumni
Academic staff of the University of Oslo
Grini concentration camp survivors
Norwegian cardiac surgeons
20th-century surgeons